Sarah Solemani (born 4 September 1982) is an English actress, writer and activist. She is best known for starring in the BAFTA winning sitcom Him & Her and playing Renee Zellweger's best friend Miranda in Bridget Jones's Baby, for which she was nominated for an Evening Standard Best Actress Award. She also had roles in the British comedy TV series Bad Education and The Wrong Mans.

Early life
Solemani was born in the London Borough of Camden and grew up in Crouch End. Her father is a Persian Jewish mathematics lecturer (now retired). After passing her A levels at the Henrietta Barnett School, she took a gap year before reading Social and Political Sciences (now the Human, Social and Political Sciences Tripos) at New Hall, Cambridge and graduating with an MA (Hons). At Cambridge, she joined the Footlights performance troupe, becoming social secretary during her first year and later vice president.

Career

Theatre
Solemani was a member of the National Youth Theatre during her gap year, during which time she appeared as Elaine in the West End theatre production of The Graduate and as Ayesha in the critically acclaimed National Theatre production of Sanctuary. 

She was a member of the Young Writer's Group attached to the Royal Court Theatre, and a writer at the Young Vic Theatre. Two plays she wrote were produced at Soho Theatre. Another of her works, The Cost of Things (2010), was presented at the Public Theater New York under the aegis of the Old Vic Theatre as part of the TS Eliot Project. In 2011, she wrote The Baron which received the Old Vic New Voices 'Ignite' award.

In 2009, Solemani appeared in Simon Stephens' play Pornography at the Tricycle Theatre in London and, in 2012, as Maryam in The House of Bernarda Alba at the Almeida Theatre. She wrote Up the Royal Borough, part of an evening of plays in response to Owen Jones' Chavs at the Lyric Hammersmith. It gained good reviews.

Television and film
Solemani's first film role was as a tableaux girl in Mrs Henderson Presents, which she performed during her third year of college. Her first major TV role was as Becky in BBC Three sitcom Him & Her, which was first broadcast in September 2010, and ran for four series, before ending in 2013.

From 2012 until 2014, Solemani starred in the BBC Three comedy, Bad Education, including its spin off movie The Bad Education Movie and a one-off special in 2022. In 2013, she featured in the BBC and Hulu's The Wrong Mans alongside James Corden. She reprised the role for  the show's second series. She wrote and starred in an of the Sky TV series Love Matters, titled episode titled "Aphrodite Fry", that aired in 2013. In 2014, she wrote the television film The Secrets. It aired on BBC One to critical acclaim.

In Hollywood, Solemani was chosen by Bill Hader and Alec Berg to be part of their writing team on Hader's new HBO show Barry. While working in the United States, she has found the American television industry has a more positive attitude towards commissioning work by women and featuring female characters in their series.

In 2019 it was announced she would adapt Jo Bloom's novel Ridley Road into a television drama. Published in 2014, Bloom's book was the result of research into the anti-Nazi London 62 Group and events involving it in the summer of 1962, with the group's activities serving as a backdrop, the title coming from the street in the East End where fascists held meetings and around which battles took place. It was broadcast by BBC One in October 2021. In 2022 she co-wrote and co-starred with Steve Coogan in Chivalry, a six episode comedy-drama  about "sexual politics in the wake of the #MeToo movement" for Channel 4.

Print
Solemani has contributed to the New Statesman, The Guardian, The Independent and Harper's Bazaar. She writes regularly for the publications Red and Glamour.

Awards and acclaim
Solemani was awarded third place in the Barry Amiel and Norman Melburn Trust/New Statesman Prize for New Political Writing on the subject: "Do women's rights remain the privilege of the developed world?" in 2005.

In 2011, Solemani won the Royal Television Society award for best Comedy Performance for her role in Him & Her along with her co-star Russell Tovey. In 2012, Solemani was named one of the year's Broadcast Hot Shots.

Activism
Solemani is against the criminalisation of sex work, and has been a champion for sex worker rights since 2002. She was nominated by the English Collective of Prostitutes (ECP) to represent them in Parliament in order to halt further efforts to criminalise clients. She was an active supporter of former shadow Home Secretary Yvette Cooper in the 2015 Labour leadership contest. She has introduced Cooper at various Labour Party events and has contributed to her speeches.

Personal life
Solemani married Daniel E. Ingram, a sustainable investment expert specialising in climate change, in Petah Tikva, Israel, on 3 June 2012. Their daughter was born in December 2013 and their son was born in May 2018. Raised by an Orthodox Jewish father and a Plymouth Brethren evangelical mother, Solemani has formally converted to Judaism along with her husband.

Filmography

Film and television

Stage

References

External links

1982 births
21st-century English actresses
Alumni of New Hall, Cambridge
English film actresses
English people of Iranian-Jewish descent
English people of Northern Ireland descent
English television actresses
Jewish English comedians
Jewish English actresses
Living people
National Youth Theatre members